Jean-Guy Chrétien (born 23 January 1946) is a Canadian former politician. Chrétien served in the House of Commons of Canada from 1993 to 2000. He is a professor and farmer by career.

Born in Coleraine, Quebec, Chrétien was elected in the Frontenac electoral district under the Bloc Québécois party in the 1993 federal election. He was re-elected in 1997 under the restructured territory of the Frontenac—Mégantic riding. Chrétien served in the 35th and 36th Canadian Parliaments but left Canadian politics after losing his riding to Liberal candidate Gérard Binet in the 2000 federal election.

External links
 

1946 births
Living people
Bloc Québécois MPs
Members of the House of Commons of Canada from Quebec
People from Chaudière-Appalaches